Disco Deewane is a 1981 Pakistani pop  album released by Pakistani singer Nazia Hassan. The music was composed by Indian-British music director Biddu who also produced it under the label of HMV India/Saregama. It charted in fourteen countries worldwide and became the best-selling Asian pop record to-date. The debut album led Nazia Hasan to overnight fame. It changed trends in music across South Asia, where it broke sales records. In India, it sold 100,000 records within a day of its release in Mumbai alone, went Platinum within three weeks, and went Double-Platinum soon after. 

In South Asia, where the music industry was previously dominated by filmi Bollywood soundtracks, Disco Deewaane was the first non-soundtrack album to become a major success across the region, paving the way for the emergence of independent Pakistani and Indian pop music scenes. It was also the first South Asian pop album to top the charts in Brazil, while also becoming a hit in Russia, South Africa, Philippines, Malaysia, Indonesia and Latin America, and a success among the South Asian diaspora in regions such as Canada, the United Kingdom, United States, and West Indies.

This song also appeared on the soundtrack of the series Ms. Marvel in Seeing Red.

Track listing

Credits

Music directors
Most of the songs were composed by Biddu
Biddu
Arshad Mehmood
Zoheb Hassan

Lyricists
Nazia & Zoheb Hassan
Anwar Khalid
Meeraji
 Farooq Qaiser
Nigar Sebhai

Cover versions

Dreamer Devané
Nazia Hassan performed a remixed cover version of title track "Dreamer Deewane" in the English language, called "Dreamer Devané" (1983), which was released as a single. It became the first single by a Pakistani Female singer to enter the UK singles chart.

Paara Ushar
In 1997, the title song "Disco Deewane" was reused in Tamil Song called "Paara Ushar" sang by K.S. Chithra.

The Disco Song
In 2012, a revamped cover version of the title song "Disco Deewane" was incorporated into the Indian Bollywood film Student of the Year. Called "The Disco Song", it incorporates Nazia Hassan's vocals, along with the vocals of Sunidhi Chauhan and Benny Dayal, while the music video features Bollywood actors, such as Alia Bhatt, Sidharth Malhotra, Varun Dhawan and Kajol.

Karan Johar used the song in his 2012 film Student of the Year after licensing the song from Sa Re Ga Ma. It has been contested by Nazia Hassan's family, as they claim that HMV doesn't own the album because it was financed by them in London.

References

Urdu-language albums
1981 debut albums
Disco albums
Nazia and Zoheb albums
Nazia Hassan albums